Danish Defence is the unified armed forces of the Kingdom of Denmark charged with the defence of Denmark and its self-governing territories Greenland and the Faroe Islands. The Defence also promote Denmark's wider interests, support international peacekeeping efforts and provide humanitarian aid.

Since the creation of a standing military in 1510, the armed forces have seen action in many wars, most involving Sweden, but also involving the world's great powers, including the Thirty Years' War, the Great Northern War, and the Napoleonic Wars.

Today, Danish Defence consists of: the Royal Danish Army, Denmark's principal land warfare branch; the Royal Danish Navy, a blue-water navy with a fleet of 20 commissioned ships; and the Royal Danish Air Force, an air force with an operational fleet consisting of both fixed-wing and rotary aircraft. The Defence also includes the Home Guard. Under the Danish Defence Law the Minister of Defence serves as the commander of Danish Defence (through the Chief of Defence and the Defence Command) and the Danish Home Guard (through the Home Guard Command). De facto the Danish Cabinet is the commanding authority of the Defence, though it cannot mobilize the armed forces, for purposes that are not strictly defence oriented, without the consent of parliament.

History

Origins
The modern Danish military can be traced back to 1510, with the creation of the Royal Danish Navy. During this time, the Danish Kingdom held considerable territories, including Schleswig-Holstein, Norway, and colonies in Africa and the Americas.

Following the defeat in the Second Schleswig War, the military became a political hot-button issue. Denmark managed to maintain its neutrality during the First World War, with a relative strong military force. However, following the Interwar period, a more pacifistic government came to power, decreasing the size of the military. This resulted in Denmark having a limited military, when Denmark was invaded in 1940.

Since the establishment of the Danish military, the two branches operated independently, without much cooperation. They both had their own ministry, and their own air force. It was only after the lessons of World War II, the branches were reorganized, and collected under the newly created Danish Defence. This was to ensure a unified command when conducting joint operations, as learned from the War.

Cold War and international engagements

Denmark tried to remain neutral after World War II, with the proposed Scandinavian defence union. However, Norway resigned from the talks, and with Cold War tensions on the rise and the 1948 Easter Crisis, Denmark was forced to join the North Atlantic Treaty. During the Cold War, Denmark began to rebuild its military and to prepare for possible attacks by the Soviet Union and its Warsaw Pact allies. During this time Denmark participated in a number of UN peacekeeping missions including UNEF and UNFICYP.

Following the end of the Cold War, Denmark began a more active foreign policy, deciding to participate in international operations. This began with the participation in the Bosnian War, where the Royal Danish Army served as part of the United Nations Protection Force and were in two skirmishes. This was the first time the Danish Army was a part of a combat operation since World War 2. On April 29, 1994, the Royal Danish Army, while on an operation to relieve an observation post as part of the United Nations Protection Force, the Jutland Dragoon Regiment came under artillery fire from the town of Kalesija. The United Nations Protection Force quickly returned fire and eliminated the artillery positions. On October 24, 1994, the Royal Danish Army, while on an operation to reinforce an observation post in the town of Gradačac, were fired upon by a T-55 Bosnian Serb tank. One of the three Danish Leopard 1 tanks experienced slight damage, but all returned fired and put the T-55 tank out of action.

With the September 11 attacks, Denmark joined US forces in the War on terror, participating in both the War in Afghanistan and the Iraq War. In Afghanistan, 37 soldiers have been killed in various hostile engagements or as a result of friendly fire, and 6 have been killed in non-combat related incidents, bringing the number of Danish fatalities to 43, being the highest loss per capita within the coalition forces. Denmark has since participated in Operation Ocean Shield, the 2011 military intervention in Libya and the American-led intervention in the Syrian Civil War.

Purpose and task

The purpose and task of the armed forces of Denmark is defined in Law no. 122 of February 27, 2001 and in force since March 1, 2001. It defines three purposes and six tasks.

Its primary purpose is to prevent conflicts and war, preserve the sovereignty of Denmark, secure the continuing existence and integrity of the independent Kingdom of Denmark and further a peaceful development in the world with respect to human rights.

Its primary tasks are: NATO participation in accordance with the strategy of the alliance, detect and repel any sovereignty violation of Danish territory (including Greenland and the Faroe Islands), defence cooperation with non-NATO members, especially Central and East European countries, international missions in the area of conflict prevention, crisis-control, humanitarian, peacemaking, peacekeeping, participation in Total Defence in cooperation with civilian resources and finally maintenance of a sizable force to execute these tasks at all times.

Total defence
Total Defence is "the use of all resources in order to maintain an organized and functional society, and to protect the population and values of society". This is achieved by combining the military, Home Guard, Danish Emergency Management Agency and elements of the police. The concept of total defence was created following World War II, where it was clear that the defence of the country could not only rely on the military, but there also need to be other measures to ensure a continuation of society. As a part of the Total Defence, all former conscripts can be recalled to duty, in order to serve in cases of emergency.

Defence budget
Since 1988, Danish defence budgets and security policy have been set by multi-year white paper agreements supported by a wide parliamentary majority including government and opposition parties. However, public opposition to increases in defence spending—during periods of economic constraints require reduced spending for social welfare — has created differences among the political parties regarding a broadly acceptable level of new defence expenditure.

The latest Defence agreement ("Defence Agreement 2018–23") was signed 28 January 2018, and calls for an increase in spending, cyber security and capabilities to act in international operations and international stabilization efforts. The reaction speed is increased, with an entire brigade on standby readiness; the military retains the capability to continually deploy 2,000 soldiers in international service or 5,000 over a short time span. The standard mandatory conscription is expanded to include 500 more, with some of these having a longer service time, with more focus on national challenges.

Expenditures

In 2006 the Danish military budget was the fifth largest single portion of the Danish Government's total budget, significantly less than that of the Ministry of Social Affairs (≈110 billion DKK), Ministry of Employment (≈67 billion DKK), Ministry of the Interior and Health (≈66 billion DKK) and Ministry of Education (≈30 billion DKK) and only slightly larger than that of the Ministry of Science, Technology and Innovation (≈14 billion DKK). This list lists the complete expenditures for the Danish Ministry of Defence.

The Danish Defence Force, counting all branches and all departments, itself has an income equal to about 1–5% of its expenditures, depending on the year. They are not deducted in this listing.

Approximately 95% of the budget goes directly to running the Danish military including the Home guard. Depending on year, 50–53% accounts for payment to personnel, roughly 14–21% on acquiring new material, 2–8% for larger ships, building projects or infrastructure and about 24–27% on other items, including purchasing of goods, renting, maintenance, services and taxes.

The remaining 5% is special expenditures to NATO, branch shared expenditures, special services and civil structures, here in including running the Danish Maritime Safety Administration, Danish Emergency Management Agency and the Administration of Conscientious Objectors (Militærnægteradministrationen).

Because Denmark has a small and highly specialized military industry, the vast majority of Danish Defence's equipment is imported from NATO and the Nordic countries.

Danish Defence expenditures (1949–1989)

Danish Defence expenditures (1990–)

Branches

Royal Danish Army

The Danish Royal Army consists of 2 brigades, organised into 3 regiments, and a number of support centres, all commanded through the Army Staff. The army is a mixture of Mechanized infantry and Armoured cavalry with a limited capabilities in Armoured warfare.

The army also provides protection for the Danish royal family, in the form of the Royal Guard Company and the Guard Hussar Regiment Mounted Squadron.

Royal Danish Navy

The Royal Danish Navy consists of frigates, patrol vessels, mine-countermeasure vessels, and other miscellaneous vessels, many of which are issued with the modular mission payload system StanFlex. The navy's chief responsibility is maritime defence and maintaining the sovereignty of Danish, Greenlandic and Faroese territorial waters.

A submarine service existed within the Royal Danish Navy for 95 years.

Royal Danish Air Force

The Royal Danish Air Force consists of both fixed-wing and rotary aircraft.

Danish Home Guard

The Home Guard is voluntary service responsible for defence of the country, but has since 2008 also supported the army, in Afghanistan and Kosovo.

Structure
 Ministry of Defence : Forsvarsministeriet (FMN)
 Defence Command : Forsvarskommando (FKO)
 Army Command : Hærkommandoen
 Naval Command : Søværnskommandoen
 Air Command : Flyverkommandoen
 Plans, Policy and Coordination Staff : Udviklings- og koordinationsstaben
 Joint Operations Staff : Operationsstaben
 Special Operations Command : Specialoperationskommandoen (SOKOM)
 Joint Arctic Command : Arktisk Kommando (AKO)
 Royal Danish Defence College : Forsvarsakademiet (FAK)
 Royal Danish Military Academy : Hærens Officersskole
 Royal Danish Naval Academy : Søværnets Officersskole
 Royal Danish Air Force Academy : Flyvevåbnets Officersskole
 Royal Danish Defence Language Academy : Forsvarets Sprogskole
 Army NCO School : Hærens Sergentskole
 Navy NCO School : Søværnets Sergentskole
 Air Force NCO School : Flyvevåbnets Sergentskole
 Defence Medical Command : Forsvarets Sanitetskommando (FSK)
 Defence Maintenance Service : Forsvarets Vedligeholdelsestjeneste (FVT)
 Ministry of Defence Acquisition and Logistics Organisation : Forsvarsministeriets Materiel- og Indkøbsstyrelse (FMI)
 Defence IT Agency : Forsvarets Koncernfælles Informatiktjeneste (FKIT)
 Ministry of Defence Personnel Agency : Forsvarsministeriets Personalestyrelse (FPS)
 Centre for Veterans Affairs : Veterancentret
 Ministry of Defence Estate Agency : Forsvarsministeriets Ejendomsstyrelse (FES)
 Home Guard Command : Hjemmeværnskommandoen (HJK)
 Defence Intelligence Service : Forsvarets Efterretningstjeneste (FE)
 Judge Advocate Corps : Forsvarets Auditørkorps (FAUK)
 Ministry of Defence Accounting Agency : Forsvarsministeriets Regnskabsstyrelse (FRS)
 Ministry of Defence Internal Auditor : Forsvarets Interne Revision (FIR)
 Emergency Management Agency : Beredskabsstyrelsen (BRS)
 Administration of Conscientious Objector : Militærnægteradministrationen (MNA)
 The Queen's Military Household and Her Majesty the Queen's Captain of the Royal Yacht

Special forces
SOCOM
 Jægerkorpset: Ground-based infiltration unit.
 Frømandskorpset: Amphibious attack and infiltration unit.
 Slædepatruljen Sirius: Arctic dog sled unit patrolling the eastern border of Greenland.

Operations

Current deployment of Danish forces, per 10-03-2016:

NATO
 A Challenger CL-604 MMA for maritime patrol in the Baltic Sea as part of NATO Allied Maritime Command.
 35 soldiers in Kosovo participating in NATO's Kosovo Force, guarding the French Camp Marechal De Lattre de Tassigny.
 97 people in Afghanistan as part of Resolute Support Mission.
 HDMS Absalon patrolling the Aegean Sea for human trafficking (September 2016).

UN
 20 people in Bamako and Gao, as part of MINUSMA.
 13 people in Juba, as part of UNMISS.
 11 people in Israel, as part of UNTSO.
 2 people in South Korea, as part of UNCMAC.

National Missions
 12 men on the Sirius Patrol of Eastern Greenland.
 A Challenger CL-604 MMA to fly patrol over Greenland.
 Rota between HDMS Lauge Koch, HDMS Knud Rasmussen, HDMS Triton and HDMS Thetis to enact sovereignty patrol in the seas of Greenland and Faroe Islands.
 A Challenger CL-604 MMA to do maritime environmental monitoring missions in the North Sea.

Coalitions
 149 people at Al Asad Airbase in Iraq to train the local military as part of Operation Inherent Resolve.
 8 people operating radars as part of the radar element in Operation Inherent Resolve.
 20 people in UAE as part of the operator element in Operation Inherent Resolve.
 Unknown number of Danish special forces in Senegal to train the local special forces as part of Flintlock 2016.

Personnel

Women in the military

Women in the military can be traced back to 1946, with the creation of Lottekorpset. This corps allowed women to serve, however, without entering with the normal armed forces, and they were not allowed to carry weapons. In 1962, women were allowed in the military.

Currently 1,122 or 7.3% of all personnel in the armed forces are women. Women do not have to serve conscription in Denmark, since 1998, it is however possible to serve under conscription-like circumstances; 17% of those serving conscription or conscription-like are women. Between 1991 and 31 December 2017, 1,965 women have been deployed to different international missions. Of those 3 women have lost their lives. In 1998, Police Constable Gitte Larsen was killed in Hebron on the West Bank. In 2003, Overkonstabel Susanne Lauritzen was killed in a traffic accident in Kosovo. In 2010, the first woman was killed in a combat situation, when Konstabel Sophia Bruun was killed by an IED in Afghanistan.

In 2005, Line Bonde became the first female fighter pilot in Denmark. In 2016, Lone Træholt became the first female general. She was the only female general in the Danish armed forces until the army promoted Jette Albinus to the rank of brigadier general on 11 September 2017.
In May 2018, the Royal Life Guards was forced to lower the height requirements for women, as the Danish Institute of Human Rights decided it was discrimination.

Conscription

Technically all Danish 18-year-old males are conscripts (37,897 in 2010, of whom 53% were considered suitable for duty). Due to the large number of volunteers, 96-99% of the number required in the past three years, the number of men actually called up is relatively low (4,200 in 2012). There were additionally 567 female volunteers in 2010, who pass training on "conscript-like" conditions.

Conscripts to Danish Defence (army, navy and air force) generally serve four months, except:
 Conscripts of the Guard Hussar Regiment Mounted Squadron serve 12 months.
 Conscripts with Cyber-conscription, who serve 10 months.
 Conscripts aboard the Royal Yacht Dannebrog serve nine months.
 Conscripts in the Danish Emergency Management Agency serve nine months.
 Conscripts in the Royal Life Guards serve eight months.

There has been a right of conscientious objection since 1917.

See also

 Danish Defence Media Agency
 Military history of Denmark
 Military of Greenland
 NATO
 Scandinavian defence union

References

 https://web.archive.org/web/20130619021047/http://www2.forsvaret.dk/omos/Publikationer/Documents/Fakta%20om%20Forsvaret_DK.pdf

External links

 Official website
 Official Facebook
 Official Picture Database
 One for all, all for one? New Nordic Defence Partnership?—Publication from the Nordic Council of Ministers. Free download.
 Norwegian and Danish defence policy: A comparative study of the post-Cold War era A historical and comparative study published by the Norwegian Institute for Defence Studies. Free download.

 
Military of the Faroe Islands
Military of Greenland